Paul Shefflin (1980 – 4 March 2022) was an Irish hurler who played at club level with Ballyhale Shamrocks and at inter-county level with the Kilkenny senior hurling team. He usually lined out at wing-back or corner-back.

Career
Shefflin first played hurling at juvenile and underage levels with the Ballyhale Shamrocks club. He simultaneously lined out as a schoolboy with St Kieran's College and subsequently won a Fitzgibbon Cup title with the Waterford Institute of Technology. After joining the Ballyhale Shamrocks senior team, he went on to win three All-Ireland Club Championship medals. Shefflin first appeared on the inter-county scene as captain of the Kilkenny minor hurling team that lost the 1998 All-Ireland minor final to Cork. He later joined the under-21 team and made a number of appearances for the Kilkenny senior hurling team in pre-season tournaments.

Personal life and death
Shefflin's brothers, John and Tommy, won All-Ireland medals in the minor and under-21 grades. A third brother, Henry Shefflin, won a record ten All-Ireland medals at senior level. After graduating from Waterford Institute of Technology he worked as an accountant. 

Shefflin died suddenly, while out running, on 4 March 2022, at the age of 41.

Honours
Waterford Institute of Technology
Fitzgibbon Cup: 2000

Ballyhale Shamrocks
All-Ireland Senior Club Hurling Championship: 2007, 2010, 2015
Leinster Senior Club Hurling Championship: 2006, 2008, 2009, 2014
Kilkenny Senior Hurling Championship: 2006, 2007, 2008, 2009, 2012, 2014

Kilkenny
Leinster Minor Hurling Championship: 1998 (c)

References

1980 births
2022 deaths
Ballyhale Shamrocks hurlers
Kilkenny inter-county hurlers